1358 may refer to

 1358, events in the year 1358 of the Gregorian calendar.
 1358 SH, a year in the Solar Hijri calendar (corresponding to 21 March 1979 – 20 March 1980 in the Gregorian calendar).

References